Veneracion is a surname. Notable people with the surname include:

 Andrea Veneracion (1928–2013), Filipino choral conductor and musician
 Ian Veneracion (born 1973), Filipino athlete, actor, pilot, and singer
 Roy Veneracion (born 1947), Filipino painter

See also
 Veneration